Mariana Esnoz (born February 25, 1984, Florida, Buenos Aires, Argentina) is an Argentinean actress and singer.

Career
Esnoz is best known for her role as Quela Musso in the teen drama Champs 12, where she also sang. In 2010 she appeared in two soap operas: Cain and Abel and Date Blind. She also starred in the plays Paris in America with Paula Castagnetti, and The Last Supper.

Television
 2012 The Sole Veronique, The Thirteen
 2010 Cain and Abel, Telefe
 2010 All against John, Rosstoc Prod
 2010 Date Blind : Valeria, Rosstoc Prod
 2009 Champs 12 : Quela, Dori Media Group

Theatre
 2011 Paris in America, the protagonist
 2009 The Last Supper by Dan Rosen. Protagonist, production and translation. Award-winning star of March 2009.

See also
 Cinema of Argentina

References

External links
facebook.com
twitter.com

Argentine actresses
21st-century Argentine women singers
Argentine people of Basque descent
Living people
1984 births